The First Federal Electoral District of Coahuila (I Distrito Electoral Federal de Coahuila) is one of the 300 Electoral Districts into which Mexico is divided for the purpose of elections to the federal Chamber of Deputies and one of seven such districts in the state of Coahuila.

It elects one deputy to the lower house of Congress for each three-year legislative period, by means of the first past the post system.

District territory
Under the 2005 districting scheme, Coahuila's First District covers the municipalities of
Acuña, Allende, Guerrero, Hidalgo, Jiménez, Morelos, Nava, Piedras Negras, Villa Unión and Zaragoza.

The district's head town (cabecera distrital), where results from individual polling stations are gathered together and collated, is the city of Piedras Negras.

Previous districting schemes

1996–2005 district
Between 1996 and 2005, the First District's territory was in the north and north-east region of the state and covered the municipalities of Acuña, Allende, Guerrero, Hidalgo, Jiménez, Morelos, Múzquiz, Nava, Piedras Negras, Villa Unión and Zaragoza.

Deputies returned to Congress from this district

L Legislature
1976–1979: José de las Fuentes Rodríguez (PRI)
LI Legislature
1979–1982:
LII Legislature
1982–1985:
LIII Legislature
1985–1988:
LIV Legislature
1988–1991: Enrique Martínez y Martínez (PRI)
LV Legislature
1991–1994: Oscar González Pimentel (PRI)
LVI Legislature
1994–1997: Alejandro Gutiérrez Gutiérrez (PRI)
LVII Legislature
1997–2000: Francisco García Castells (PRI)
LVIII Legislature
2000–2002: Claudio Mario Bres Garza (PRI)
2002–2003: Armín Valdés Torres (Suplente) (PRI)
LIX Legislature
2003–2006: Jesús María Ramón Valdés (PRI)
LX Legislature
2006–2009: Ángel Humberto García Reyes (PAN)

References

Federal electoral districts of Mexico
Federal Electoral District 01
Federal Electoral District 01